Heterocerus maindroni, is a species of variegated mud-loving beetle found in India, and Sri Lanka.

It can be identified with almost parallel-sided basal piece of aedeagus laterally.

References 

Byrrhoidea
Insects of Sri Lanka
Beetles described in 1903